Gurdeep Singh Shahpini is an Indian politician from the Sangaria Assembly constituency in Rajasthan. He is a member of the 15th Assembly of Rajasthan as a Bharatiya Janata Party member.

Political career
Gurdeep Singh started his political career in the 2008 Rajasthan Legislative Assembly election from Sangaria constituency, losing with 28212 (20.04%) votes.

In 2013, he again contested the Rajasthan Legislative Assembly elections from Sangria constituency in which he finished third with 40,994 (23.58%) votes.

In 2018, he again contested the Rajasthan Legislative Assembly election from Sangaria constituency, winning with 99064 (49.37%) votes.

References

1963 births
People from Rajasthan
Bharatiya Janata Party politicians from Rajasthan
Rajasthan MLAs 2018–2023
Living people